Christopher O'Donnell (born 17 May 1998) is an Irish track and field athlete competing in sprinting events. He represented Ireland at the 2020 Summer Olympics in the  Mixed 4 x 400m relay where he was part of the first ever Irish team to run in an Olympic final, setting a new National Record of 3:12.88. He is the current Irish U20 record holder in the 400 metres, with a time of 46.54, set on 22 July 2017 at the European U20 Championships, where he finished 6th in the final. His personal best of 45.26 seconds sits joint-2nd on the Irish all-time list.

Biography

Early life and career
Born in Sligo, Christopher O'Donnell grew up primarily as a football player, representing his local side Benbulben FC and the Sligo/Leitrim Youth Schoolboys League. Operating mainly as a winger, O'Donnell was selected to represent the Sligo/Leitrim Youth Schoolboys League at the prestigious SFAI Kennedy Cup tournament in Limerick in June 2012. Described as a "formerly deft underage footballer", his raw speed on the football pitch was gaining attention and was encouraged to start competing in track and field sprint events for his local club North Sligo AC. He attempted to juggle both sports for a couple of years before eventually deciding to focus his efforts full-time on track and field at the age of 16 in 2015.

In 2014, coached by former Irish International athlete Roddy Gaynor, O'Donnell earned his first International vest at the SIAB Schools International in Cardiff, competing in the 100 metres and the 4x100 metres relay. In the relay he was part of the silver medal-winning team which finished with a time one-hundredth of a second outside of the Irish U18 record. He went on to gain another International call up that year, competing in the same events at the Celtic Games U18 International in Dublin, winning two silver medals. He won three national titles that year in the U17 category in the 100m and 200m, narrowly missing out on the Championship records in both events outdoors. In 2015, O'Donnell had his first taste of the 400 metres, and despite finishing runner-up in the national U18 indoors, his time of 50.25 was under the previous Championship record held by Brian Gregan. He went on to go one better in the outdoor equivalent, while smashing the previous record with a time of 48.70 which still stands to this day.

In 2016 he was prolific at national underage level, winning the indoor and outdoor U19 and U20 400m, along with the outdoor U19 200m, beating the Championship record with a time of 21.59 (+0.7) which is still standing. He also still holds the Ulster schools 400m record of 48.57 which was achieved on his way to winning his first senior schools 400m title. He was also part of the national U20  winning team with his club. In 2017 he successfully defended his indoor U20 400m title along with the senior schools title, where he was 0.12 seconds off the record. That summer seen a big breakthrough over 400m where he won his race at the IFAM International in Oordegem in 46.92, which was an "A" standard for the European U20 Championships in Grosseto. The Sligo athlete competed magnificently at the Championships, comfortably winning his heat before winning a competitive semi-final in a personal best time. He again beat his personal best in the final, finishing 6th in 46.54, which is currently the Irish U20 record. He gained his first senior International vest that year, finishing 2nd in the  relay at the European Team Championships First League in Vaasa.

That winter he moved his training base to Loughborough University under the guidance of Nick Dakin, who had previously coached Irish record holder David Gillick, where he would train full-time alongside studying for a degree in Sport and Exercise Science on a sports scholarship. In 2018 O'Donnell won his first national senior title in the 400 metres, and represented Ireland in his first senior major Championships at the European Championships in Berlin in the 400m and  relay. In July 2019, following disappointment at the European U23 Championships and failing to improve on his personal best times under Dakin, O'Donnell returned to Sligo to be coached by Gaynor again on an interim basis until the end of the season. From there he ended the season with four consecutive seasons bests, concluding with an equal personal best. Firstly, he successfully defended his national senior 400m title before finishing 2nd and 3rd in the 400m and  respectively at the European Team Championships in Sandnes, where he was an integral part in helping Ireland remain in the First League. He then equalled his personal best of 46.54 from 2017, finishing runner-up in the Brussels Grand Prix.

Ahead of the 2020 season, O'Donnell would return to Loughborough to be coached by former GB youth International Michael Baker. A limited season resulted with no International Championships due to the COVID-19 pandemic, but he still managed to improve his personal bests in the 400m and 200m, while also winning the national 400m title (1st U23) for the third year in a row, and bronze in the 200m (2nd U23). The Nationals were held across two weekends and amalgamated the U23 and senior Championships together. 2021 seen O'Donnell become a mainstay in the Irish mixed 4x400m team where he was part of the first ever Irish team to run in the final of the World Athletics Relays in Silesia and in doing so broke the national record and qualified for the Tokyo 2020 Olympic Games. In Tokyo he anchored the team to further improve the national record on the way to becoming the first ever Irish team to run in an Olympic Final. His season's best of 45.55 seconds would place him 3rd on the all-time list of Irish 400m running. He parted company with Baker during the season and teamed up with Swedish sprints coach Benke Blomkvist in Loughborough following the Olympic Games.

O'Donnell moved to joint-2nd on the Irish 400m all-time list in 2022,  while being part of the first ever Irish team to run in a World Championship final, once again with the Mixed 4x400m relay team, in Eugene. He was also part of the National Indoor record-breaking 4x400m team who achieved a 7th place finish at the World Indoor Championships in Belgrade. Individually in the 400m at Championships, O'Donnell achieved a semi-final and 20th place finish at the World Championships, while also bowing out at the semi-final stage of the European Championships in Munich with an 11th place finish. He won his fourth national 400m title in five years in June.

International Championships

Honours
National
400m: 2018, 2019, 2020, 2022

National underage
Schools 400m: 2016, 2017
U20 400m: 2016
Indoor U20 400m: 2016, 2017
U19 400m: 2016
U19 200m: 2016
Indoor U19 400m: 2016
U18 400m: 2015
U17 100m: 2014
U17 200m: 2014
Indoor U17 200m: 2014

International
Top 8 finish at Olympic Games: 2021
Top 8 finish at World Championships: 2022
Top 8 finish at World Indoor Championships: 2022
Top 8 finish at World Athletics Relays: 2021
European Team Championships First League 400m: 2019(2nd)
European Team Championships First League 4x400m: 2017(2nd), 2019(3rd)

International underage
Celtic Games U18 400m: 2015
Celtic Games U18 4x400m: 2015
Celtic Games U16 100m: 2014(2nd)
Celtic Games U16 4x100m: 2014(2nd)
SIAB Schools 4x100m: 2014(2nd)

University
BUCS 4x400m: 2022

 Individual 
Irish Schools' "Male" athlete of the Year: 2017
Sligo Juvenile All-Star: 2014, 2015, 2016
Connacht Athlete of the Year: 2022
Connacht Sprinter of the Year: 2021, 2022

Records
National Mixed 4x400m (3:12.88): 2021
National Indoor 4x400m (3:08.63): 2022
Connacht 400m (45.26): 2022
North Sligo AC 200m (21.09): 2022
North Sligo AC 400m (45.26): 2022
National U20 400m (46.54): 2017
BUCS 4x400m Championship (3:05.11):  2022
National U19 200m Championship (21.59): 2016
National U18 400m Championship (48.70): 2015
Ulster Schools 400m Championship (48.57): 2016
Connacht Schools 400m Championship (48.92): 2017

Personal bests
100 metres – 10.83 (+1.4 m/s, Newham, 2021)
200 metres – 21.09 (-1.2 m/s, Kettering, 2022), 21.07 (+2.4 m/s, Dagenham, 2022)
400 metres - 45.26 (Madrid, 2022)
600 metres – 1:22.55i (Athlone, 2016)
4 × 100 metres relay - 42.19 (Cardiff, 2014)
4 × 400 metres relay - 3:05.08 (Vaasa, 2017)
Mixed 4 × 400 metres relay - 3:12.88 (Tokyo, 2021)

Season's bests

References

External links
 
 
 
 

1998 births
Living people
Irish male sprinters
Sportspeople from County Sligo
Olympic male sprinters
Olympic athletes of Ireland
Athletes (track and field) at the 2020 Summer Olympics